Racism in Korea may refer to:

 Racism in North Korea
 Racism in South Korea